Vasily Nazarovich Rykov (Russian: Василий Назарович Рыков); (August 13, 1918, Vladivostok - October 18, 2011, Moscow) was a Soviet politician and diplomat.

In 1936, he studied at an Industrial institute in Novocherkassk. In 1943, he joined the Communist Party of the Soviet Union. He became the Second Secretary of the Leningrad Regional Committee of the CPSU in 1952. From 1963 to 1975 he was the Second Secretary of the Central Committee of the Communist Party of Turkmenistan in the Turkmen Soviet Socialist Republic. In 1975, Rykov joined the Ministry of Foreign Affairs of the USSR. Between 1975 and 1988, he worked as the Soviet Ambassador to Algeria and India. He retired in Moscow and died there in 2011.

References 

Soviet politicians
1918 births
2011 deaths
Politicians from Vladivostok
Ambassadors of the Soviet Union to Algeria
Ambassadors of the Soviet Union to India